Fu Liang (傅亮; 374–426), courtesy name Jiyou (季友), was a high-level official of the Chinese Liu Song dynasty, who, along with his colleagues Xu Xianzhi and Xie Hui, deposed Emperor Shao after the death of Emperor Wu (Liu Yu) due to their belief that Emperor Shao was not fit to be emperor.  However, he was later arrested and killed by Emperor Shao's successor and brother Emperor Wen.

During Jin Dynasty
Fu Liang became known for his literary abilities in his youth, and he served as the assistant to the general Huan Qian (桓謙), a cousin of the warlord Huan Xuan.  After Huan Xuan usurped the throne in 403, Huan Xuan heard of his abilities and made him a court secretary, intending for him to reorganize the imperial archives, but before the project could get underway, Huan Xuan was overthrown by the coalition of forces led by Liu Yu.  He then served as an assistant to Liu Yu's confederate Meng Chang (孟昶).  He became briefly in charge of editing imperial edicts, but soon left his post as his mother died and he underwent the mandatory three-year mourning period.  He resumed those responsibilities once the mourning period was over, and for a while, Liu Yu wanted to make him the governor of the rich Dongyang Commandery (東陽, roughly modern Jinhua, Zhejiang), but Fu declined, preferring to remain close to Liu Yu.  Subsequently, in 415, when Liu Yu attacked the general Sima Xiuzhi (司馬休之), whom he suspected of opposing him, Fu became one of his assistants, and from that point on he directly served on Liu Yu's staff.

Fu Liang continued to serve Liu Yu on the campaign where he destroyed Later Qin in 416 and 417.  In late 417, after Liu Yu completed the campaign and accepted the title Duke of Song, Fu became a high-level official for the dukedom.  In 420, Liu Yu, then at Shouyang, was intending to usurp the Jin throne, but could not bring himself to say it completely, and so invited his high-level staff to a feast where he talked about his achievements but his intent to retire afterwards.  None of the staff members understood what he meant, but a few hours later, Fu realized what Liu Yu meant, and therefore, deep at night, went in to see Liu Yu and requested to return to the capital Jiankang.  Liu Yu saw that Fu understood what he meant, and therefore did not say anything further other than approving his journey.  Once Fu was at Jiankang, he hinted to Emperor Gong of Jin to first recall Liu Yu to Jiankang, and then pressured him to issue an edict offering the throne to Liu Yu.  Liu Yu accepted, establishing Liu Song (as Emperor Wu) and ending Jin.

During Emperor Wu's reign
After Liu Yu seized the throne, he created Fu the Duke of Jiancheng.  Fu became in charge of all imperial edicts.  He became famed, along with Xu Xianzhi, and the minister Zheng Xianzhi (鄭鮮之) once, while observing Xu and Fu Liang, commented, "If you hear the words that Xu and Fu spoke, you will no longer consider yourself a learned person."

When Emperor Wu grew ill in 422, he entrusted his crown prince Liu Yifu to Xu, Fu, Xie Hui, and Tan Daoji, and soon died. Liu Yifu succeeded him (as Emperor Shao), and in the mourning period, he had Xu and Fu handle important matters for him.

During Emperor Shao's reign
Emperor Shao soon became known for spending much time on frivolous matters with impertinent attendants, even during the three-year mourning period, and not on studies or important matters of state. Xu, Fu, and Xie became convinced that he was not a fit emperor, and considered deposing him. However, they had even lower opinions of his oldest younger brother, Liu Yizhen (劉義真) the Prince of Luling, so they first stoke the rivalry that Emperor Shao already had with Liu Yizhen and then accused Liu Yizhen of crimes. In 424, Emperor Shao reduced Liu Yizhen to commoner rank and exiled him.

Xu, Fu, and Xie then prepared to remove Emperor Shao as well.  Because they were apprehensive about the powerful armies that Tan and Wang Hong had, they summoned Tan and Wang to the capital and then informed them of the plot. They then sent soldiers into the palace to arrest Emperor Shao, after first persuading the imperial guards not to resist. Before Emperor Shao could get up from bed in the morning, the soldiers were already in his bedchamber, and he made a futile attempt to resist, but was captured. He was sent back to his old palace. The officials then, in the name of Emperor Shao's mother Empress Dowager Zhang, declared Emperor Shao's faults and demoted him to Prince of Yingyang, offering the throne to his younger brother Liu Yilong the Prince of Yidu instead.  (Xu's associate Cheng Daohui (程道惠) had initially urged that Xu offer the throne to an even younger brother, Liu Yigong (劉義恭) the Prince of Jiangxia, to control power longer, but Xu and Fu believed Liu Yilong to be capable and therefore decided on him.)  Xu remained at Jiankang, while Fu went to Liu Yilong's post at Jing Province (荊州, modern Hubei) to welcome him.

Before Liu Yilong could accept or arrive at Jiankang, Xu and Fu sent assassins to kill both Emperor Shao and Liu Yizhen.  (Fu had changed his mind after advice from the official Cai Kuo (蔡廓), but his letter to Xu to try to stop the assassinations arrived too late.)  Liu Yilong, initially apprehensive of the officials' intentions in light of Emperor Shao's and Liu Yizhen's deaths, did not accept the throne, but after advice by Wang Hua (王華), Wang Tanshou (王曇首, Wang Hong's brother), and Dao Yanzhi (到彥之), accepted, and he advanced to Jiankang and took the throne (as Emperor Wen).

During Emperor Wen's reign
Fearful that Emperor Wen would act against them, Xu and Fu, prior to Emperor Wen's arrival at Jiankang, made Xie the governor of Jing Province to replace him, with the intent that Xie and Tan can counteract against the emperor should the emperor act against them.  Once Emperor Wen had ascended the throne, he kept Xu and Fu content by keeping them in their posts.  In 425, Xu and Fu offered to resign, and Emperor Wen approved and began to handle important matters of state himself.  However, Xu's nephew Xu Peizhi (徐佩之) and his associates Cheng and Wang Shaozhi (王韶之) persuaded him that he did not need to resign, and thereafter he reassumed his post.  (While it was not explicitly stated in history, it appeared that Fu then did so as well.)

However, Emperor Wen was resentful that Xu, Fu, and Xie had killed his two older brothers, and in late 425 planned to destroy them, particularly at the urging of Wang Hua and the general Kong Ningzi (孔寧子).  He therefore mobilized troops and publicly declared that he was going to attack rival Northern Wei, but was privately preparing to arrest Xu and Fu while engaging in a military campaign against Xie.  In spring 426, rumors had leaked of such a plan, and so Xie began to prepare for armed resistance.  Soon, Emperor Wen publicly issued an edict ordering that Xu, Fu, and Xie be arrested and killed, while issuing a separate edict summoning Xu and Fu to the palace.  Xie's brother Xie Jiao (謝嚼) received news of this and quickly informed Fu.  Fu tried to flee, but was arrested by imperial forces.  Emperor Wen told him that because of his diligence when he arrived at Jing Province to welcome him, his sons would be spared.  However, Fu defiantly responded that he, Xu, and Xie deposed an incompetent emperor and installed a capable one for the empire's sake, and that the charges against him were bogus.  Emperor Wen executed him and exiled his wife and children to Jian'an (建安, in modern Nanping, Fujian).

Responsive Manifestations of Avalokitesvara 
Fu Liang was instrumental in completing an important piece of Buddhist writing, Guangshiyin yingyanji 光世音應驗記, by writing the preface to the work originated by Xie Fu 谢敷 (fl. mid- to late 4th century) and supplementing it with the 7th part recorded from memory. Albeit short, the text is important as the earliest known collection of the Buddhist miracle tales. Its c. 12th-century manuscript copy was preserved in the Seiren Monastery 青蓮院 in Kyoto, Japan. The rediscovery was announced in 1943. The manuscript is accompanied by the sequel pieces written in the 5th century by Zhang Yan 張演, a Buddhist layman, and Lu Gao 陸杲 (459-532).

Jin dynasty (266–420) politicians
Liu Song regents
374 births
426 deaths
Executed Liu Song people
5th-century executions
Executed Northern and Southern dynasties people
People executed by Liu Song
People executed by a Northern and Southern dynasties state by decapitation